The Skip Away Stakes is an American Thoroughbred horse race run annually at Gulfstream Park in Hallandale Beach, Florida. A Listed event open to horses age four and older, it is contested on dirt over a distance of  miles (9 furlongs).  The race is a Listed event with a current purse of $100,000.

Inaugurated as the Broward Handicap, in 2001 Gulfstream Park changed the name to the Skip Away Handicap to honor 1998 American Horse of the Year, Skip Away.

In 2000, the South African-bred Horse Chestnut, 1999 Horse of the Year in his native country, made his American debut in this race, winning going away by five and one-half lengths. Other past winners of note include U.S. Racing Hall of Fame inductee Swaps who won in 1956 and set a new world record for 1 mile, 70 yards with time of 1:39 3/5.

Since its inception, the race has been run at various distances:
  miles : 1987, 1990, 1993–2004
  miles : 1991-1992, 2005–2008, 2016-2017
  miles : 2009-2015, 2019

Records
Speed record:
 1:48.10 - Chief Honcho (at current distance of  miles) (1991)
 1:53.92 - Fort Larned (at former distance of  miles) (2012) (This is also the track record, eclipsing the former track record set by Eddington in 2005 of 1:54.74.)

Most wins:
 3 - Sir Bear (1998, 1999, 2002)

Winners since 1987

References
 The 2009 Skip Away Handicap at the NTRA

Graded stakes races in the United States
Flat horse races for four-year-olds
Open middle distance horse races
Horse races in Florida
Gulfstream Park
Recurring sporting events established in 1987
1987 establishments in Florida
Grade 3 stakes races in the United States